Bleecker & MacDougal is the first solo album from Fred Neil, a pioneer folk rock musician, issued by Elektra in 1965. The recording, which unlike many folk albums at the time featured electric guitar backing, had a significant influence on the folk rock movement.

Guest musicians included Felix Pappalardi on bass, a young John Sebastian playing harmonica, and Pete Childs on dobro and electric guitar.

Except for two tracks, all of the songs on the album were written by Neil. Bleecker & MacDougal was reissued as Little Bit of Rain in 1970.

The album is named for the intersection of Bleecker Street and MacDougal Street in the Greenwich Village neighborhood of New York City. A picture of the intersection featured on the album cover. The San Remo Cafe can be seen in the picture, a gathering spot for writers and musicians for decades. Both streets were important locales for folk and rock music of the period.

Track listing 
All tracks composed by Fred Neil; except where indicated

 "Bleecker & MacDougal" – 2:14
 "Blues on the Ceiling" – 2:24
 "Sweet Mama" – 2:35
 "Little Bit of Rain" – 2:23
 "Country Boy" – 2:27
 "Other Side to This Life" – 2:56
 "Mississippi Train" – 2:14
 "Travelin' Shoes" – 2:18
 "The Water is Wide" (Traditional) – 4:18
 "Yonder Comes the Blues" – 1:52
 "Candy Man" (Neil, Beverly "Ruby" Ross) – 2:29
 "Handful of Gimme" – 2:15
 "Gone Again" – 3:13

Personnel 
 Fred Neil - guitar, vocals
 Pete Childs - dobro, guitar, baritone guitar
 Felix Pappalardi - bass
 Douglas Hatfield - bass
 John Sebastian - harmonica

Production 
 Producer: Gordon Anderson
 Production Supervisor: Jac Holzman
 Recording Engineer: Paul Rothchild
 Art Direction: William S. Harvey
 Photography: Mort Schuman
 Liner Notes: Skip Weshner

References 

1965 debut albums
Fred Neil albums
Elektra Records albums